The Samoa national under-20 association football team represents Samoa in under-20 competitions and is controlled by the Football Federation Samoa, the governing body for football in Samoa. Samoa's U20 home ground is Toleafoa J.S Blatter Soccer Stadium in Apia. It was known as the Western Samoa national under-20 football team until 1997, following the renaming of the country. Samoa is a part of the FIFA Goal project.
The 2022 squad consisted of 18 non-Samoan based players out of a squad of 26, this was made possible through extensive worldwide scouting, no other country in the OFC region has seen this amount of off shore players in an U20 squad.

Competitive record

OFC

The OFC Under 20 Qualifying Tournament is a tournament held once every two years to decide the only two qualification spots for the Oceania Football Confederation (OFC) and its representatives at the FIFA U-20 World Cup.

Current technical staff

Current squad
The following players were called up for the 2022 OFC U-19 Championship from 7 to 20 September 2022. Names in italics denote players who have been capped for the Senior team.

Caps and goals as of 19 September 2022 after the game against Fiji.

Results and fixtures

2016

2018

References

External links
Samoa Football Federation official website

Football in Samoa
under-20
Oceanian national under-20 association football teams